Reporter is a political magazine published in Slovenia. The magazine was first published in May 2008. The editors of the magazine are mostly former contributors of now-defunct Slovene magazine, Mag. Reporter is published on a weekly basis. The magazine has a rightist political stance.

See also
 List of magazines in Slovenia

References

External links
 Official website

2008 establishments in Slovenia
Magazines established in 2008
Slovene-language magazines
Political magazines published in Slovenia
Weekly magazines